Below is an incomplete list of fictional feature films which include events of the Spanish Civil War (1936–1939) in the narrative.

For short films about the Spanish Civil War, see the List of World War II short films.

Films made during the Spanish Civil War

Films made afterwards

Science fiction, fantasy, and horror

See also
List of World War II films

References
Unless otherwise stated, the source for film information is the IMDb.

Lists of war films
Films